A by-election was held for the New South Wales Legislative Assembly electorate of Patrick's Plains on 4 July 1861 because of the resignation of William Lesley.

Dates

Result

William Lesley resigned.

See also
Electoral results for the district of Patrick's Plains
List of New South Wales state by-elections

References

1861 elections in Australia
New South Wales state by-elections
1860s in New South Wales